Talisia setigera is a species of plant in the family Sapindaceae. It is endemic to Ecuador. It can also be found in Peru and Colombia.

References

setigera
Endemic flora of Ecuador
Endangered plants
Taxonomy articles created by Polbot